Roza Lallemand (8 August 1961 – 26 August 2008) was a French chess player of South Korean origin who was raised in the Soviet Union.
She was  European chess champion in 2001 and represented France several times at the Chess Olympiad.

Life

Roza Te was born in North Korea in 1961. She had five siblings.
When she was five years old the whole family emigrated to the Soviet Union apart from her mother, who moved to South Korea and would only be allowed to rejoin her family after many years. The separation was very difficult for the young Roza.

Seen to be a good chess player, Roza Te was sent to Moscow at the age of 11 to attend a school reserved for young chess players with high potential.
She would only see her family every six months.
These separations from her family gave her a certain firmness of character and reserved attitude to strangers she would keep all her life.
She studied Russian literature while continuing with chess and graduated as a librarian and a "master of sports" in chess.
After the fall of the Berlin Wall in 1989, Roza Te began to participate in tournaments in Western Europe.
She met her husband, Daniel Lallemand, and obtained French nationality in 1997.

Roza Lallemand died in August 2008 of a heart attack after returning from the French Chess Championship, where she finished sixth in the Women's National, a competition that seems to have made her very tired.
The French Chess Federation commemorated her in 2009 by calling the women's fast games championship of France the "Trophée Roza Lallemand".

Career

Individual 

In 2000 Roza Lallemand became the first female French international grandmaster after Chantal Chaudé de Silans, who had obtained the honorary title in recognition of her performance when the official title did not yet exist.
She finished 3rd in the French Chess Championship in 2000 and 2003 .

Team 

Roza Lallemand participated several times in the Chess Olympiad in the French women's team.
In 2000 her team finished 39th, in 2002 they finished 24th and in 2006 they finished 18th.
She became European women's team champion in 2001 in León, Spain. 
Russia and Armenia did not compete.
Her Elo ranking was then 2,287 points and she achieved a performance of 2,333 points.
She also participated in 2005 in the European Team Chess Championship in Gothenburg where her team finished 16th and where, with a ranking of 2,287 she achieved a performance of 2,311 points.

Roza Lallemand played for the Monaco Chess Club from 1999 to 2006, where she played in the Top 16 (first division of French interclub competition). 
The team was champion of France in 2001 and 2002 and vice-champion in 2004 and 2006.
She then played for the Bischwiller Club in 2007 and 2008.

Playing style 

Roza Lallemand had a predilection for the Open Game, and often opened with 1. e4.

She was considered a free player, with a "high" game and a good sense of initiative.
Gilles Mirallès described her after she died as "capable of carrying out sudden attacks" and wrote that she was "feared for her brilliant sacrifices."
He saw her as representing a "romantic" spirit of chess that had become all too rare in the modern age.

Notable game 

A game played by Roza Lallemand (white) against Maia Lomineichvili at the fourth round of chess in the European Championship of Nations in Gothenburg in 2005.
Lomineishvili was a member of the Georgian team that finished second in these Olympics.

1. e4 c5 2. Nf3 Nc6 3. Bb5 d6 4. d4 cxd4 5. Qxd4 Bd7 6. Bxc6 Bxc6 7. Nc3 Nf6 8. Bg5 e6 9. O-O-O Be7 10. Rhe1 O-O 11. Qd2 Qa5 12. Kb1 Qa6 13. Nd4 Rfc8 14. f3 Be8 15. h4...
It is clear that both sides wish to attack.
15. ...b5 16. g4 b4 17. Nce2 Qb7 18. Ng3 a5 19. Rg1 a4 20. Nh5 Nxh5 21. gxh5 b3 22. cxb3 axb3 23. a3 Kh8
By this move the blacks are trying to defend themselves against the arrival of the bishop in h6 but... 
24. Bh6! ...
The precautions of the blacks against this blow will not have been enough.

24. ...Bf6?
Not wanting to weaken their king, the blacks refuse to play g6, which would no doubt have been better.
25. Bxg7+...
!!
25. ...Bxg7 26. Rxg7 Kxg7 27. Rg1+ Kf8 28. Nf5 Rc1+ 29. Rxc1 exf5 30. Qxd6+ 1-0

This game shows the precision of Roza Lallemand's play and her taste for a game of attack as well as tactics and combinations.

Notes

Sources

}

External links 

 

1961 births
2008 deaths
Soviet female chess players
French female chess players
20th-century chess players
20th-century French women